Dendrobium crumenatum, commonly called pigeon orchid, or 木石斛 (mu shi hu) is an epiphytic orchid in the family Orchidaceae and is native to Asia, Southeast Asia, New Guinea and Christmas Island. It has two rows on leaves along its pseudobulb and relatively large but short-lived, strongly scented white flowers. It usually grows in exposed positions in lowland rainforest and coastal scrub.

Description
The side lobes are erect and the middle lobe is rounded with five yellow ridges. Flowering is sporadic but is triggered nine days after a sudden drop in temperature of at least , usually as a result of rain, although the same effect can be artificially created. The flowers are fragrant, but the scent lasts only for one day.

Taxonomy and naming
Dendrobium crumenatum was first formally described in 1799 by Olof Swartz and the description was published in Heinrich Schrader's Journal für die Botanik. The specific epithet (crumenatum) is derived from the Latin word crumena meaning "leather moneybag".

Distribution and habitat
The pigeon orchid usually grows in exposed locations, often in lowland rainforest or coastal scrub. It is found in India, Indochina, Taiwan, the Philippines, Singapore, Malaysia, Indonesia, New Guinea, and Christmas Island. It is reportedly naturalized in Fiji, Hawaii, the West Indies and the Seychelles.

References

External links 
 

crumenatum
Orchids of Asia
Orchids of Malaya
Orchids of Oceania
Orchids of Australia
Orchids of India
Orchids of Indonesia
Orchids of Malaysia
Orchids of New Guinea
Orchids of Papua New Guinea
Orchids of the Philippines
Orchids of Taiwan
Flora of Christmas Island
Flora of Indo-China
Flora of the Indian subcontinent
Plants described in 1799